This article contains a list of fossil-bearing stratigraphic units in the state of Colorado, U.S.

Sites

See also

 Paleontology in Colorado

References

 

Colorado
Stratigraphic units
Stratigraphy of Colorado
Colorado geography-related lists
United States geology-related lists